Luge is one of the seven Olympic sports currently contested at the Winter Olympic Games. It has been a constant presence in the Olympic program since its introduction at the 1964 Winter Olympics in Innsbruck, Austria, in the form of three events: men's singles, women's singles, and doubles. A mixed team relay event was contested for the first time at the 2014 Winter Olympics in Sochi.

History 
Italian luger Armin Zöggeler is the overall medal leader in the sport, having collected a total of six medals (two gold, one silver, and three bronze) in the men's singles, during the six Winter Games in which he competed (1994–2014). As of 2021, he is the only Olympian to receive six medals in the same event. German luger Georg Hackl was the first Olympian to receive a medal in five consecutive Olympics, from 1988-2002, including three consecutive gold medals.

In the women's event, Germany's Silke Kraushaar leads the medal count with three, one of each color. Steffi Martin and Sylke Otto—at 36, the oldest female individual gold medalist at the Winter Games—are the only lugers with two gold medals in their career. Ortrun Enderlein, representing the United Team of Germany, was the first woman to win the singles event in 1964. She was on the verge of defending her title at the 1968 Grenoble Games, having the best overall time after all the runs, but was disqualified together with fellow countrywomen Anna-Maria Müller (2nd) and Angela Knösel (4th) when it was discovered that the runners in their sleds had been illegally heated before the runs. Müller made up for this by taking the gold medal at the following Games, in Sapporo, Japan.

The most successful pair in the history of the Olympic doubles event was Stefan Krauße and Jan Behrendt, who represented East Germany in 1988 and the reunified German Olympic team from 1992 to 1998, winning four medals: two golds, one silver, and one bronze. East Germany's Hans Rinn and Norbert Hahn, and Austrian brothers Andreas and Wolfgang Linger, are the other pairs to have won two times, both of them in consecutive Olympics. In 1972, two gold medals were awarded to an East German (Horst Hörnlein and Reinhard Bredow) and an Italian pair (Paul Hildgartner and Walter Plaikner), who finished with exactly the same time. To prevent similar situations in future Olympics, the Fédération Internationale de Luge de Course introduced timing equipment that measured accurately to one thousandth of a second, to replace the old equipment that measured in hundredths of a second.

As of the 2018 Winter Olympics, 141 medals (48 gold, 46 silver, and 47 bronze, with two golds in the 1972 doubles event) have been awarded, representing 11 National Olympic Committees (NOC). German lugers—representing the United Team of Germany (1964), West Germany (1968–1988), East Germany (1968–1988), and Germany (1992–2018)—have dominated this sport, collecting a total of 81 medals. There were seven occasions when a single NOC filled the podium with its athletes and in all of them they were German. After 2018, Germany is the current medal-leading NOC in the sport with 37 medals (18 gold, 10 silver, and 9 bronze), followed by East Germany's 29 medals.

Medalists

Men's singles 

Medals:

Women's singles 

Medals:

Men’s doubles 

Medals:

Team relay

Statistics

Medal leaders 
Athletes that have won at least two medals are listed below. Medalists are sorted first by the total number of medals, then successively by the number of gold, silver and bronze medals. If a tie is still verified, medalists are ordered chronologically by their first medal.

Men

Women

Medals per year

Medal sweep events
These are events in which athletes from one NOC won all three medals.

 In addition to sweeping the podium, the country also had the fourth-place finisher.

See also 
FIL World Luge Championships
FIL World Luge Natural Track Championships

Notes

References 
Medalists

Citations

External links 
 International Luge Federation

Luge
medalists